Ralph Day Nichols (March 1, 1874 – July 19, 1949) was an American college football player and coach and politician. He served as the head coach at the University of Washington from 1895 to 1896 and again in 1898, compiling a record of 7–4–1.

Nichols later served in the Washington Senate from 1906 to 1919 and on the Seattle City Council from 1924 to 1934. From 1917 to 1919, he was president pro tempore of the Senate. Nicholas died on July 19, 1949.

Head coaching record

References

External links
 

1874 births
1949 deaths
19th-century players of American football
American football guards
Washington Huskies football coaches
Washington Huskies football players
Seattle City Council members
Republican Party Washington (state) state senators
People from Panora, Iowa
Players of American football from Iowa